Georg Jander is an American plant biologist at the Boyce Thompson Institute in Ithaca, New York. He has an adjunct appointment in the Plant Biology Section of the School of Integrative Plant Sciences at Cornell University. Jander is known for his molecular research identifying genes for biochemical compounds of ecological and agricultural importance, particularly those plant traits involved in resistance to insect pests.

Education 
Jander earned his undergraduate degree in computer science from the McKelvey School of Engineering at Washington University in St. Louis in 1983. As a Ph.D. student in Microbiology and Molecular Genetics, working under the supervision of Jon Beckwith at Harvard Medical School, he wrote a thesis titled Genetic studies on protein folding and protein secretion in Escherichia coli, and is an author of journal publications in this research area. While working as a postdoctoral fellow in the lab of Fred Ausubel at Massachusetts General Hospital, Jander initiated research on the molecular biology and genetics of Arabidopsis thaliana defense against insect herbivores. He continued his research training in plant genetics and molecular biology as a scientist at the Monsanto Company from 1998 to 2002.

Research 

Since joining the Boyce Thompson Institute as a faculty member in 2002, Jander has studied several plant species, including maize (Zea mays), mouse-ear cress (Arabidopsis), wallflowers in the genus Erysimum. In each plant species, Jander's laboratory uses techniques in biochemical genetics to identify the genetic causes of plant secondary metabolism involved in plant defenses against insects. A particular focus of the Jander lab has been research involving plant interactions with aphids. Jander's research publications have been cited more than 17,000 times by other scientists.

Jander's research collaborators and co-authors in the field of chemical ecology include: Anurag Agrawal, Clare Casteel, Andre Kessler, Gaurav Moghe, Katja Poveda, Rob Raguso, and Jennifer Thaler at Cornell University, Eric Schmelz at UC San Diego, Melkamu Woldemariam at The College of New Jersey, Cynthia Holland at Williams College, Asaph Aharoni at the Weizmann Institute, and Tobias Züst at the University of Zurich.

Graduate student alumni of the Jander lab are: Tengfang Huang, VP for Research at Elo Life Systems, Dezi Elzinga, research scientist at Zymtronix, John Ramsey, research molecular biologist at the USDA, Yann-Ru Lou, assistant professor in Plant Biology at UC Davis, and Shaoqun (Simon) Zhou, principal investigator at the Agricultural Genomics Institute of Shenzhen.

Since 2005, Jander has been the principal investigator for a plant-focused undergraduate summer internship program at the Boyce Thompson Institute. Undergraduate research internships are currently funded by US National Science Foundation award #1850796 and United States Department of Agriculture award #2022-67037-3622. Notable alumni of the summer research program include Adam Steinbrenner, assistant professor at the University of Washington, Kaitlin Gold, assistant professor at Cornell University, and Karl Kremling, senior scientist at Inari Agriculture.

Honors and awards 
Friedrich Wilhelm Bessel Research Award from the Humboldt Foundation (2011)
Fellow, American Association for the Advancement of Science (2012) 
Fellow, American Society of Plant Biologists (2022)

References

External links 
 Georg Jander – Google Scholar citations
 Georg Jander – Boyce Thompson Institute website

21st-century American botanists
Living people
20th-century American botanists
Cornell University faculty
Chemical ecologists
American entomologists
Harvard Graduate School of Arts and Sciences alumni
1965 births
McKelvey School of Engineering alumni